Sceloporus ornatus, the ornate spiny lizard, is a species of lizard in the family Phrynosomatidae. It is native to Texas in the United States and Mexico.

References

Sceloporus
Reptiles of the United States
Reptiles of Mexico
Reptiles described in 1859
Taxa named by Spencer Fullerton Baird